The Pittsburgh Pirates are a Major League Baseball (MLB) franchise based in Pittsburgh, Pennsylvania. They play in the National League Central division. The team began play in 1882 as the Alleghenies (alternatively spelled "Alleghenys") in the American Association. The franchise moved to the National League after owner William Nimick became upset over a contract dispute, thus beginning the modern day franchise. The team currently plays home games at PNC Park which they moved into in 2001. Prior to PNC Park, the Pirates played games at Three Rivers Stadium and Forbes Field, among other stadiums.

There have been 46 managers for the Pittsburgh Pirates franchise. The Pirates' first manager upon joining the National League was Horace Phillips, who had coached the team before their move to the National League. In 1900, Fred Clarke began his tenure with the franchise. Clarke's 1422 victories and 969 losses lead all managers of the Pirates in their respective categories, Clarke also had the longest tenure as manager in his 16 years in the position. Clarke managed the franchise to its first World Series victory, a feat that would also be accomplished by Bill McKechnie, Danny Murtaugh, and Chuck Tanner. Thirteen Pirates managers have been player-managers—those who take on simultaneous roles as a player and manager. McKechnie, Connie Mack, and Ned Hanlon were inducted into the National Baseball Hall of Fame and Museum as managers. Five Pirates managers were inducted into the Hall of Fame for their performance as players. Billy Meyer's number 1, Pie Traynor's number 20, Honus Wagner's number 33, and Murtaugh's number 40 have been retired by the franchise. Hired before the 2020 season, the Pirates' current manager is Derek Shelton.

Table key

American Association

National League

Footnotes 
a The Alleghenies began the 1889 season with a record of 28–43; manager Horace Phillips suffered a mental breakdown and was replaced by Fred Dunlap who coached the team to a 7–10 record over the next 17 games. Ned Hanlon, the team's center fielder, was brought in to finish the season as manager, leading the team to a winning record of 26–18.
b Hanlon left the team to join the Players' League in 1890, but returned after the League disbanded after one season. Upon his return Hanlon replaced Guy Hecker. After disagreements with management, however, Hanlon was demoted as manager with a 31–47 record in his second stint as manager. Bill McGunnigle finished the 1891 season as manager.
c Patsy Donovan managed the team to a 60–71 record in 1897, finishing in eighth place. He was replaced by Bill Watkins who managed the team for over one season, but after a 7–15 start to the 1899 campaign Donovan resumed his position as manager and finished his second stint with a 69–58 record.
d George Gibson coached 374 games from 1920–1922, winning 201 and losing 173. He coached 359 games from 1932–1934, winning 200 and losing 159.
e Bobby Bragan coached the Pirates to a 36–67 record in 1957, before being replaced by Danny Murtaugh. Murtaugh coached the team for eight seasons during his first stint, coaching 1154 games for 605 wins and 549 losses. Harry Walker took over for Murtaugh, until a 42–42 start in 1967 caused management to bring back Murtaugh to finish the season as manager. Murtaugh went 39–39 to conclude the 1967 campaign. Murtaugh's third stint as Pirates manager lasted two seasons, he was 186–138 overall, winning a World Series in the second season. Bill Virdon was the Pirates for one season, but after beginning his second 67–69, Murtaugh was brought in for his fourth term as manager. Murtaugh finished his final term with a 285–226 record.

Image gallery

References 

Pittsburgh Pirates managers
Pittsburgh Pirates
Managers